The Amazeen House is an historic house at 15 Weeks Street in Houlton, Maine, United States.  This imposing -story Italianate house was built c. 1882 as a speculative venture, probably intended for use as a hotel, based on the projected route of the New Brunswick Railway.  It is one of Houlton's most impressive 19th-century houses, and was listed on the National Register of Historic Places in September 1986.

Description and history
The Amazeen House is located in a residential area near Houlton's central business district, surrounded by early 20th-century houses.  It is a -story wood-frame structure with a steeply-pitched gable roof.  The main facade, facing north, is three bays wide, with a center entrance flanked by two-story polygonal window bays.  The wall of this facade is flushboarded, while other facades are finished in clapboards and novelty siding.  The front is covered by a three-story porch, with square posts and balustrade.  A second porch, just one story in height covers part of the rear and features Italianate brackets; part of this porch has been enclosed.  A large -story carriage barn is connected to the rear of the house.

The house was built c. 1882 as a speculative venture by Stephen D. Amazeen, in the anticipation that the New Brunswick Railway might extend service in the direction of its location, and locate a station and junction there.  This extension was never built, and the building has always seen residential use, first as a home for the Amazeens, and later as multi-unit housing.

See also
National Register of Historic Places listings in Aroostook County, Maine

References

Houses completed in 1882
Houses in Aroostook County, Maine
Houses on the National Register of Historic Places in Maine
Buildings and structures in Houlton, Maine
Italianate architecture in Maine
National Register of Historic Places in Aroostook County, Maine